Karl Eduard Biermann (1803–92) was a German landscape painter.

Biography
He was born in Berlin. He was at first a decorative painter, but afterwards studied landscape in Switzerland, the Tyrol, and Italy, and was one of the founders and most prominent members of the Berlin school of landscape painting. He was for some time a professor in the Berlin Academy. His style has been characterized as in general forceful and harmonious, large in outline, and somewhat decorative in detail.

Works
 Evening in the High Alps (1842), a highly regarded piece
 View of Florence (1834)
 Tasso's Oak (1836)
 Isle of Philæ
 Temple of Edfu
 Sixteen watercolors on motives drawn from Dalmatia (1853)

See also
 List of German painters

References

1803 births
1892 deaths
19th-century German painters
19th-century German male artists
German male painters
German landscape painters